Fides quaerens intellectum means "faith seeking understanding" or "faith seeking intelligence". It is the theological method stressed by Augustine (354–430) and Anselm of Canterbury ( – 1109) in which one begins with faith in God and on the basis of that faith moves on to further understanding of Christian truth. 
Anselm uses this expression for the first time in his Proslogion (II–IV). It articulates the close relationship between faith and human reason. This is the key to Anselm's theological thought and philosophical thinking. He would understand all things in faith. It means to understand intellectually what we already believe. Chronologically, faith precedes understanding, like when small children first trust their parents and believe what they state, and it is only later on, when they grow up, that they want to examine and understand the reality by themselves. In the words of Anselm of Canterbury : "Neque enim quaero intelligere ut credam, sed credo ut intelligam" ("I do not seek to understand in order that I may believe, but rather, I believe in order that I may understand").

See also

 Credo ut intelligam

References

Further reading
Karl Barth : « Fides quaerens intellectum » ; La preuve de l'existence de Dieu d'après Anselme de Cantorbéry, Delachaux et Niestlé (Bibliothèque de Théologie), Neuchâtel et Paris, 1958, 160 p. (cours donné à Bâle, en allemand en 1930). 
Marilyn McCord Adams : « Fides Quaerens Intellectum »; St. Anselm’s Method In Philosophical Theology, dans Faith and Philosophy, vol. 9 (1992), 4. 
Julien Bayart : The Concept of Mystery According to St. Anselm of Canterbury, dans Recherches de Théologie ancienne et médiévale, vol. 9 (1937).
Michel Corbin : La significations de l’unum argumentum du Proslogion, dans Anselm Studies, vol. 2 (1988).
Étienne Gilson : Sens et nature de l’argument de saint Anselme, dans  Archives d’histoire doctrinale et littéraire du Moyen Age, vol. 9 (1934).
Alvin Plantinga : The Ontological Argument, from St. Anselm to Contemporary Philosophers, Garden City, New York, Anchor Books, 1965.
Katherine Rogers : Can Christianity be Proven? Saint Anselm on Faith and Reason, dans Anselm Studies, vol. 2 (1998).

Latin religious words and phrases
Philosophical phrases
Christian terminology
Quotations from philosophy
Quotations from literature
Faith in Christianity
Augustine of Hippo